WWE Tough Enough 2 is a compilation album of music related to the MTV reality TV series WWE Tough Enough. Cold's "Gone Away" served as the album's single with a popular music video released in mid-April 2002. According to a label spokesperson mere weeks before the album's release, Tough Enough 2 was to include a track by Godsmack.

"Gone Away"
The album's single, a moody ballad, was originally written for Cold vocalist Scooter Ward's daughter Raven. It focuses on missing family while being on the road and traveling to performances, a necessary evil in both music and professional wrestling. Regarding the song's addition to the Tough Enough 2 album, Ward said:
"Leaving home all the time, never being here because we were on the road — I thought that [wrestlers] must feel the same way because they travel a lot. They leave their family and all that, so I figured I'd just send [what I was working on] to them, thinking they'd never pick it up, but they did."

The song's music video was credited as from Cold's then-forthcoming album Year of the Spider, which wouldn't be released until a year later. Two videos were made, the original having been shot in March 2002 in the group's hometown of Jacksonville, Florida, by director Paul Boyd. In it, the daughter is seen on one of three giant projection screens as Cold perform in a plush, empty theater while fans are projected on the other screens. The audience, some of which traveled from Chicago to be cast into the video, was also treated to a few other Cold songs at the small venue.

Track listing

See also

Music in professional wrestling

References

WWE albums
Heavy metal albums by American artists
2002 compilation albums
Hard rock compilation albums
2002 soundtrack albums
Universal Records compilation albums